The Maytag-Mason Motor Company of Waterloo, Iowa manufactured Maytag automobiles from 1910 to 1912. The company's founder was Frederick Louis Maytag I, who is better known for his development of the Maytag washing machine company.

History 
Mr. Maytag formed the company by purchasing a controlling interest in the Mason Automobile Company of Des Moines, Iowa in 1909. That company, which had been created by Fred Duesenberg, August Duesenberg, and lawyer Edward R. Mason, had been producing an automobile called the Mason.  

The former Waterloo Motor Works in Waterloo, Iowa was purchased for automobile production.  Maytag-Mason brought out a new four-cylinder engine and the larger car for 1910 was called Maytag. The two-cylinder engine car continued to be called the Mason.

Large parts purchases did not match slowing sales and the company went into receivership in 1911.  Mr. Maytag sold his interest in the company, and in 1912 the company was reorganized as Mason Motor Company.  This company went into receivership in 1915 and was closed down by 1917.  Approximately 983 Maytag cars were built.

Models

References

External Links 
Maytag-Mason at ConceptCarz
George Hess is a Maytag-Mason Expert - Article

Defunct motor vehicle manufacturers of the United States
Brass Era vehicles
1910s cars
Duesenberg
Motor vehicle manufacturers based in Iowa
Cars introduced in 1910
Vehicle manufacturing companies established in 1910
Vehicle manufacturing companies disestablished in 1912